Captain Oats or Captain Oates may refer to:

 Lawrence Oates (1880 – 1912), an English cavalry officer with the 6th (Inniskilling) Dragoons, and later an Antarctic explorer
 William Oats (1841 – 1911), an Australian mining engineer and politician
 a toy horse belonging to the fictional character Seth Cohen